Philippe Beaulne is a Canadian diplomat.

Biography 

Philippe Beaulne graduated from University of Ottawa and joined the Department of External Affairs in 1982 and has served in Port-au-Prince (twice), Paris and Dakar. In 2001, Beaulne was appointed ambassador to Guinea, with concurrent accreditation to Sierra Leone. In Ottawa, he worked in Central American, Caribbean and Middle East relations and in political intelligence analysis. He also served as deputy director of the West and Central Africa Division. Beaulne was director of the Francophonie Affairs Division since 2005 and played a major role in organizing and delivering the Francophonie Summit held in October 2008 in Quebec City.

On June 15, 2009, Lawrence Cannon, Canadian Minister of Foreign Affairs, announced that Philippe Beaulne becomes Ambassador to Romania, with concurrent accreditation to the Republic of Bulgaria, and High Commissioner to the Republic of Cyprus; Beaulne succeeds Marta Moszczenska.

He is married to Élizabeth Hilaire and has three children.

References

Ambassadors of Canada to Guinea
Year of birth missing (living people)
Living people
High Commissioners of Canada to Sierra Leone
Ambassadors of Canada to Romania
High Commissioners of Canada to Cyprus
Ambassadors of Canada to Bulgaria